Pierre-Louis Le Bris (6 February 1929 – 6 June 2015), known as Pierre Brice, was a French actor, best known as portraying fictional Apache-chief Winnetou in German films based on Karl May novels.

Life and films
Brice was born in Brest, Brittany, France. When he was 19, Brice enlisted in the French Army and fought in the First Indochina War. While patrolling in Indochina, one of his team triggered a mine and its explosion sent Brice whirling through the air, but left him virtually unhurt. Member of the Commandos Marine, special forces units of the French Navy, he served later as a paratrooper during the Algerian War.

From 1962 to 1968 he acted in a total of eleven West German Western movies adapted from novels by German author Karl May, in which he played the fictional Native American chief Winnetou of the Mescalero Apache tribe, alongside Lex Barker (7 movies), Stewart Granger (3 movies) and Rod Cameron (1 movie) as co-stars. After the films he also played this role at the Karl May Festspiele in Elspe from 1977 to 1980 and 1982 to 1986 and at the Karl May Festival in Bad Segeberg open-air theatre, Germany, from 1988 to 1991; he also worked there until 1999 as director of several open-air theatre productions. (The open-air theatre in Bad Segeberg is dedicated only to productions of Karl May plays.)

Besides theatre productions, he was mainly seen in TV-series, including Ein Schloß am Wörthersee (A Castle by the Wörthersee) and Die Hütte am See (Lakeview Cottage). In 1979 Brice again played Winnetou in a 14-part TV series called Mein Freund Winnetou (My friend Winnetou – Winnetou le Mescalero), which did not originate from Karl May material. In 1997 he appeared in a two-part TV mini series  (The Return of Winnetou), which earned devastating criticism from the fans, since the character had died in the movie Winnetou III and now suddenly returned to life. Again, this did not originate from writings by Karl May.

Brice tried to escape the Winnetou character in a 1976 TV series, Star Maidens, and in several movies for the big screen, playing Zorro in the Italian Zorro contro Maciste (1963). He also worked with Terence Hill (still called Mario Girotti at the time) in Shots in Threequarter Time (1965), with Lex Barker in a non-Karl May film The Hell of Manitoba ( A Place Called Glory) (1965) and in the anthology Killer's Carnival (1966).

Pierre Brice died of pneumonia on 6 June 2015 in a Paris hospital.

Singing career

Like Lex Barker (who recorded two tracks as a singer), Brice tried to sing with the help of German composer Martin Boettcher, and even managed to issue several singles and CDs. Most of the songs were in German and, as Brice did not understand the language at the time of recording, he had to sing them phonetically.

PIERRE BRICE: Ich steh' allein / Ribanna – DECCA D 19 557 (mono)
PIERRE BRICE: Wunderschön / Keiner weiß den Tag – Decca, D 19 560
PIERRE BRICE: Winnetou, Du warst mein Freund / Meine roten Brüder – Barclay
PIERRE BRICE: Du fehlst mir / Der große Traum – CBS
Winnetou du warst mein Freund – 1996, sampler CD, Bear Family Recordscontains the above songs, as well as Lex Barker songs.

Partial filmography

Ça va barder (1955) - (uncredited)
Le Septième Ciel (1958) - Un joueur
Young Sinners (Les Tricheurs), directed by Marcel Carné (1958) - Bernard
Le Miroir à deux faces (1958) - Jacques
The Restless and the Damned (1959) - (uncredited)
The Cossacks (1960) - Boris Sarubin
Lipstick (Il rossetto), directed by Damiano Damiani (1960) - Gino Luciani
Call Girls of Rome (1960) - L'avvocato Aldo
Mill of the Stone Women (1960) - Hans von Arnim
L'Homme à femmes (1960) - Laurent Berty
The Pharaohs' Woman (La Donna dei Faraoni, 1960) - Amosis the Physician
The Bacchantes (1961) - Dionysus
Akiko (1961) - Duilio
The Robbers (1962) - El Señorito
Douce violence (1962) - Maddy
Invasion 1700 (1962) - Jan Ketusky
Treasure of the Silver Lake (1962) - Winnetou
Un alibi per morire (1962)
The Shortest Day (1963) - Un ufficiale austriaco (uncredited)
The Invincible Masked Rider (1963) - Don Diego Morales
Zorro contro Maciste (Samson and the Slave Queen, 1963) - Zorro / Ramon
Apache Gold (Winnetou 1, 1963) - Winnetou
Pacto de silencio (1963) - Jean Clausel
Old Shatterhand (1964) - Winnetou
Golden Goddess of Rio Beni (1964) - Jim
Last of the Renegades (Winnetou 2, 1964) - Winnetou
Among Vultures (1964) - Winnetou
Shots in Threequarter Time (1965) - Philippe Tissot
The Hell of Manitoba (1965) - Reese
The Oil Prince (1965) - Winnetou
The Desperado Trail (Winnetou 3, 1965) - Winnetou
Old Surehand (1965) - Winnetou
Dacii (1966) - Roman General Septimius Severus
Killer's Carnival (1966) - Agent Brice (Rome segment)
Winnetou and the Crossbreed (1966) - Winnetou
Winnetou and Old Firehand (1966) - Winnetou
 (1967) - François
The Valley of Death (1968) - Winnetou
Un giorno, una vita (1970) - Giuliano
 Erika (1971) - Renato Laurana
The Night of the Damned (1971) - Jean Duprey
Les coups pour rien (1971) - Paul
 (1972) - Barrett
 (1973) - Jacques
Una cuerda al amanecer (1974) - Campanita 'Little Bell'
Sex Pot (La pupa del gangster, 1975) - Commissario Salvatore Lambelli
Star Maidens (1976, TV series) - Adam
Mein Freund Winnetou (1980, TV series) - Winnetou
Ein Schloß am Wörthersee (1991–1993, TV series) - André Blondeau
 (1993, TV film) - Pierre Latouche

References

Sources
Pierre Brice biography on (re)Search my Trash

External links

Homepage of Pierre Brice 
Profile, Almissa.com

1929 births
2015 deaths
Actors from Brest, France
French male film actors
French male television actors
French pop singers
French military personnel of the First Indochina War
French military personnel of the Algerian War
Officers Crosses of the Order of Merit of the Federal Republic of Germany
Deaths from pneumonia in France
20th-century French male singers